Alan Carter (born 19 August 1964 in Halifax) is an English former professional Grand Prix motorcycle road racer. He competed from 1983 to 1990 in the Grand Prix world championship. Carter won the second Grand Prix race he entered, in the 250cc class at the 1983 250cc French Grand Prix as an eighteen-year-old, creating a sensation. However, he was never able to fulfill his potential and never won another Grand Prix. He had his best season in 1985 when he finished in seventh place in the 250cc world championship. Carter competed in the Superbike World Championship in 1994.

Carter is the younger brother of former two-time British Speedway Champion Kenny Carter (1961–1986).

Racing career statistics
Points system from 1969 to 1987:

Points system from 1988 to 1992:

(key) (Races in bold indicate pole position; races in italics indicate fastest lap)

References

1964 births
Living people
Sportspeople from Huddersfield
English motorcycle racers
250cc World Championship riders
500cc World Championship riders
Superbike World Championship riders